The Kearsarge Arts Theater (KAT) Company is a long-established, non-profit summer program for children interested in the arts. It is based in the New London area of New Hampshire. 

KAT operates out of the Kearsarge Regional High School annually for the entire month of July. Classes include chorus, dance, visual art, photography, acting, improve, costuming, technical theater, and more. Depending on the class offerings, students have the option of taking up to two morning classes and one afternoon class. The end of the month culminates in performances for those in the higher-level performing arts classes and are treated as a community or small professional musical productions open to the public.

Programs 
KAT offers classes within its summer program, which may vary year to year and often attempt to tie into the themes of the main stage shows.

Your theater 
Kat's longest-running and main-stage theater class is You theater. Students audition for parts at the beginning of the month, and participate in rehearsals 12:45-4PM, Monday through Thursday, to collaborate on large-scale, Broadway-style musicals that show for five performances at the end of the fourth week. Students work with a large cast, professional music directors and dance choreographers, and work in a professional rehearsal process with integrated technical and performance processes.

Recent productions include musicals such as Peter Pan, God-spell, The Wizard of Oz, Disney's Beauty and the Beast, and Seussical the Musical. Alternatively, KAT occasionally produces both new and original musicals, such as its award-winning 2002 production of A You & Me World, or the similarly themed Hope Is Like a Feather (2007) and the recurring Mail to the Chief (2000 & 2004). In 2010, they performed A Star Spangled Salute, honoring the soldiers fighting overseas. Casts often number well into the seventies, including performers aged 8–18 with varying levels of experience, and occasional professional guest performers and returning alumni.

KAT Cabaret 
More geared towards the experienced performer, KAT Cabaret begins the summer program with a week-long intensive rehearsal process. Students work under the direction of Robb Dimmick. Often set in the round or thrust-stage style, performances take place in the school's cafeteria/lobby area, which undergoes major transformations to become the chosen production's setting. Performers interact with audiences before the performances in an optional dessert-theater. Food items are available for additional purchase, and the performers act as waiters, chefs and hosts at individual tables.

Productions range from original revues created by Dimmick to full musicals. Recent productions include noted Broadway shows like Putting It Together (2008), Honk! The Musical (2007), and original revues Christmas in July (2006) and A Celtic Cabaret (2005). The revue-style format, smaller casts and more intimate playing space (under 100 seats) give students the chance to build strong ensemble work while allowing each the opportunity to shine in various musical numbers. With an earlier production schedule (beginning one week before normal KAT classes and performing one week in) older performers often take KAT Cabaret concurrently with KAT Your theater, allowing for a largely varied theatrical experience for the month of July.

In 2009, Cabaret celebrated its 20th year with Celebrate! 20 Songs for 20 Years, a musical theater revue which was built around the talents and performing style of each individual ensemble member. For the first time in its 20-year history, KAT cut Cabaret's performing schedule from two weekends down to one, adding an extra matinee showing for younger (and elderly) audiences.

Awards and honors 
Throughout its long history, KAT has received some honors and recognition for both its staff and its productions.

Outstanding productions 
In 2002, Dr. Lindberg's original musical production of A You & Me World, performed with an international cast and based on the writings of children across the world, gained recognition as the New England Theater Conference's pick for Youth & Children's Theater category before going on to win the prestigious Moss Hart Trophy as the Overall Best Production for 2002. At the awards ceremony in Bedford, New Hampshire, Dr. Lindberg thanked the NETC for recognizing "unique and outstanding productions throughout the six-state region," and announced that an international tour of the production would be taking place in South Africa the following summer.

Additionally, starting in 2008, KAT applied for submission into the statewide New Hampshire Theater Awards. In its first competing production (The Wizard of Oz), KAT took away 11 top-ten nominations in the community theater category, including Best Director and Best Production. At the NHTA ceremony on February 10, 2009, KAT was honored to receive two awards for members in its production: Best Costume Design (Jessica Pribble), and Best Actor (Kai de Mello-Folsom, for his work as "The Scarecrow"). In its second year running, KAT has been nominated for 7 top-ten nominations for its production of God-spell.

Artistic Director Trish Lindberg 
Artistic Director Dr. Trish Lindberg has been the recipient of numerous awards for her work in the integrated arts and children's theater. In 2003, she received the National Youth Theater Director of the Year Award from the American Alliance for Theater and Education (AATE).  The same year, Dr. Lindberg was named the Plymouth State University Distinguished Teacher of the Year (2003) and one of New Hampshire's most remarkable women by New Hampshire Magazine (2003). In 2004, she was awarded New Hampshire Professor of the Year by the Carnegie Foundation for the Advancement of Teaching and the Council for Advancement and Support of Education, and in 2007 she received the Excellence in Education Award from the New Hampshire Department of Education. In 2007, Dr. Lindberg was specially honored with the Excellence in Children's Theater Award from the New Hampshire Theater Awards, a statewide non-profit organization which recognizes outstanding productions and contributions to the NH Theater scene, professionally and in the community sector.

National and international tours 
For nearly a decade, KAT has been the hub for a number of international theatrical tours, hosted independently or through the Plymouth State University's International Outreach programs. In these programs, a handful of student performers

In 2000, KAT began its tradition with a national tour of its original summer production, Mail to the Chief. Written and conceived by Dr. Trish Lindberg, the production was based on the writings by American children to the next president, and in its touring production featured 45 young performers from Massachusetts and New Hampshire. After premiering in NH, the production was invited to the John F. Kennedy Center in Washington, D.C., for a special run of performances for its newly commissioned, free public performance Millennium Stage Theater.

References

External links
 KAT Company website

Theatre companies in New Hampshire